The U.S. Post Office, also known as the Willows Main Post Office or US Post Office–Willows Main, is the main post office in Willows, California. Built in 1918, the post office was designed by Walter D. Bliss and William B. Faville, architects known for their work in San Francisco. The building was designed in the Italianate and Beaux-Arts styles. The building's roofline and arched arcade entrance with Doric columns were inspired by the Italianate style, while its detail work, including terra cotta reliefs, quoining, and decorative keystones, is Beaux-Arts styled. While many Italianate Beaux-Arts post offices were built in the early 20th century, the Willows post office was one of the few built in California. In addition, it is one of the few ornately designed buildings in Willows and has been called the "most sophisticated and imposing" of those which exist.

The post office was added to the National Register of Historic Places on January 11, 1985.

See also 
List of United States post offices

References

External links 

Willows, California
Buildings and structures in Glenn County, California
Government buildings completed in 1918
Willows
Beaux-Arts architecture in California
Italianate architecture in California
National Register of Historic Places in Glenn County, California